Point of Astorg is a peak in the Spanish Pyrenees which rises to 3,354 m above sea level, in the Maladeta massif. It is the second highest peak in the massif, after Aneto (3,404 m) and the fourth highest peak in the Pyrenees, behind Aneto, Pico Posets and Monte Perdido.

Toponymy 
The summit was called Lerilica Peak until it was climbed on July 9, 1901 by Count René d'Astorg (1860-1940), a French Pyrenean. The summit was renamed in his name.

Punta de Astorg is the highest point of a large ridge called Cresta Maldito in Spanish, literally "cursed ridge" in English. The first ascents in the Maladeta massif to overcome the Aneto were indeed the cause of several disasters in the glaciers. The death in 1824 in the bergschrund of the Maladeta glacier of Pierre Barrau of the Compagnie des guides de Luchon, caused real emotion among the local guides: the latter, already very frightened by the risks of the glacier, were then panicked by this massif which they now considered cursed.

Geography

Location 

Punta de Astorg is a peak in the Maladeta massif, in the Posets–Maladeta Natural Park, on the ridge separating the Vallibierna valley to the south and the Benasque valley to the north.

The summit overlooks the Coronas lakes and Ibon Maldito (2,970 m) to the north, which is the third highest lake in the Pyrenees. To the west is Lake Cregüena.

The latter is in sharp decline due to climate change. During the last century it has lost more than half of its surface, and by 2050 it could disappear.

Topography 

Within the Maladeta massif, Punta de Astorg is located between the Maladeta and the Aneto. It is separated from the latter by a little individualized summit, the peak of Coronas (3,293 m and 30 meters in relative height).

It is the highest point of Cresta Maldito which is also known as Cresta del Medio, in reference to its central position between Aneto and Maladeta. This narrow ridge extends almost horizontally like a wall for more than 600 m, at an altitude of nearly 3,350 m, between its northwestern end called Pico Maldito (3,354 m) and its southeastern end called Pico del Medio (3,346 m).

Pico Maldito and Pico del Medio have negligible topographic prominence (about ten meters) and are therefore de facto anterior peaks of the Punta de Astorg according to the alpine criterion of bulletin 145 of the UIAA; but they are nevertheless listed in the UIAA list of Pyreneans three-thousanders as main summits. However, the northwest end (Pico Maldito) is a topographically important ridge knot, being at the intersection of Cresta Maldito, Cresta de Cregüena and Cresta de Los Portillones. North of Pico Maldito, there is a small peak classified in the UIAA list of Pyrenean three-thousanders as a secondary summit: the Aguja Schmidt-Endell (3,335 m); this summit, like the Pico Maldito and the Pico del Medio, also has an insignificant peak height (about ten meters).

Punta de Astorg has a peak height of 157 metres, making it a first-rate summit.

History 
The first ascent took place on July 9, 1901. René d'Astorg and Henri Brulle were accompanied by guides Célestin Passet and François Bernat-Salles. Punta de Astorg was therefore climbed late in the history of the Pyrenees: a century after Monte Perdido, which has the same altitude, and 60 years after that of Aneto.

Henri Béraldi recounts this first ascent in his book Cent Ans aux Pyrénées:

References 

Mountains of Aragon
Mountains of the Pyrenees
Pyrenean three-thousanders